Holderness is an English surname, relating to the peninsula of Holderness in Yorkshire. Notable people with the surname include:

Fay Holderness (1881–1963), American actress
George Holderness (1913–1987), British Anglican bishop
Graham Holderness (born 1947), English writer and critic
Henry Holderness (1889–1974), New Zealand cricketer
Sue Holderness (born 1949), English actress
Thomas Holderness (1849–1924), Indian Civil Service officer
The Holderness Family, American YouTubers

See also
Holness

English-language surnames
English toponymic surnames